The 2013 Open Féminin de Marseille was a professional tennis tournament played on outdoor clay courts. It was the sixteenth edition of the tournament which was part of the 2013 ITF Women's Circuit, offering a total of $100,000 in prize money. It took place in Marseille, France, on 3–9 June 2013.

WTA entrants

Seeds 

 1 Rankings as of 27 May 2013

Other entrants 
The following players received wildcards into the singles main draw:
  Myrtille Georges
  Mathilde Johansson
  Victoria Larrière
  Andrea Petkovic

The following players received entry from the qualifying draw:
  Amandine Hesse
  Lyudmyla Kichenok
  Grace Min
  Irina Ramialison

The following players received entry into the singles main draw as lucky losers:
  Jill Craybas
  María Irigoyen
  Anaève Pain

Champions

Singles 

  Andrea Petkovic def.  Anabel Medina Garrigues 6–4, 6–2

Doubles 

  Sandra Klemenschits /  Andreja Klepač def.  Asia Muhammad /  Allie Will 1–6, 6–4, [10–5]

External links 
 2013 Open Féminin de Marseille at ITFtennis.com
  

Open Feminin De Marseille
Open Féminin de Marseille
2013 in French tennis